Strung Out on Avenged Sevenfold is the name of:

Strung Out on Avenged Sevenfold: The String Tribute
Strung Out on Avenged Sevenfold: Bat Wings and Broken Strings